A.S.D. Alliphae is an Italian association football club based in Alife, Caserta, Campania. The club currently plays in Eccellenza Molise.

History
The club was founded in 2007 as A.S.D. Atletico Matese Alife and has been sponsored by Banca Capasso Antonio - S.P.A., Alife's local bank.

Colours and badge
Alliphae's home colours are yellow and blue. The badge, which is derived from the town of Alife's 'Coat of Arms', depicts an elephant carrying a crenellated tower on its back whilst playing football.

Nearby clubs
Their closest rivals in terms of distance are Piedimonte Matese-based clubs Tre Pini Matese and F.W.P. Matese. Alliphae also shares a rivalry with Caserta based outfit Casertana, which plays in Serie C (formerly Lega Pro). The distance between Alife and Piedimonte Matese is about 3.3 miles (5.5 km), whilst Caserta is approximately 24 miles (40 km) away.

Current squad

Non-playing staff

Staff

References

External links

 Official Facebook Page
 Official Twitter Page

Football clubs in Italy
Football clubs in Campania